Nights of Farewell is a 1965 Soviet-French drama film directed by Isaak Menaker and Jean Dréville.

Plot 
The film tells about the young dancer Marius Petipa, who is invited to St. Petersburg, which will completely change his life.

Cast 
 Gilles Ségal as Marius Petipa
 Oleg Strizhenov as Pyotr Tchaikovsky
 Jacques Ferrière as Anton Minkh
 Natalya Velichko as Mashenka Surovshchikova
 Nikolay Cherkasov as Gedeonov
 Nikolay Trofimov as Petrov
 Gennadiy Nilov as Lev Ivanov
 Alla Larionova as Lyubov Leonidovna

References

External links 
 

1965 films
1960s Russian-language films
Soviet drama films
1965 drama films